Otar Beg, also known as Otar Khan, later known as Zu al-Faqār Khan (born circa. 1583, – died 1662/63), was a Safavid military commander, royal gholam, and official from the Georgian Baratashvili-Orbelishvili (Orbeliani) clan.

Biography
Not much is known about the early life of Otar Beg. His original family name was Baratashvili-Orbelishvili, which is also referred to as Orbeliani and Qaplanshvili. His father's name was Aslamaz and he had two younger brothers, Vakhushti and Gorjasbi (Mansur), who also held prominent positions like him. According to Alexander Orbeliani (1802–1869), Otar had one more brother named Kaykhosrow. He furthermore had a known younger cousin named Qaplan Baratashili-Orbelishvili (Orbeliani) (?–1671), who had fled to mainland Iran in the early 17th century after the death of his father Erizbar Baratashvili-Orbelishvili, the latter being therefore Otar's uncle. 

Otar was mentioned for the first time in the Iranian sources in 1626, when he held the function of darugha (prefect) of New Julfa, having succeeded Mirman Mirimanidze (Safiqoli Khan) on this post. When king Abbas I died in 1629, he had already been appointed as governor of Semnan and possessed the rank of soltan. Later, in 1649, during the reign of king Abbas II (r. 1562–1666), he was given the governorship of Qandahar in the easternmost territories, as well as the honorary name of Zu al-Faqār Khan. When Qandahar was surrounded by the Mughal forces in 1653, the city nearly fell due to the protracted siege, and Otar was blamed for his soft attitude. According to the contemporary Safavid historian and author Valiqoli Shamlu, who served Otar personally in Qandahar, Otar answered that he would fight alone till the end and, after his death, behave as generals liked to do. He is quoted: "I have served the Safavid kings for seventy years. My bones are made from Shah's (kings) different kinds of graces".

References

Sources
 
  
 

1580s births
1660s deaths
Shia Muslims from Georgia (country)
Iranian people of Georgian descent
Safavid prefects of New Julfa
Safavid governors of Semnan
Safavid governors of Qandahar
Nobility of Georgia (country)
Safavid generals
17th-century people of Safavid Iran
Safavid ghilman